Dave Clarke discography may refer to:
The discography of Dave Clarke (musician)
The discography of Dave Clarke (DJ)